Gamamedaliyanage John Paris Perera (14 March 1922 - 1976) was a Ceylonese politician. He was the Deputy Chairman of Committees and Member of Parliament from 1960 to 1977.

Perera first contested for parliament at the 1956 general election in the Ja-Ela electorate, representing the United National Party (UNP). At the election he polled 19,132 votes (43% of the total vote) but was unsuccessful losing to the Sri Lanka Freedom Party (SLFP) candidate Stanley de Zoysa by 5,249 votes. He re-contested the seat of Ja-Ela at the 4th parliamentary election, held on 19 March 1960, where he defeated the sitting member, de Zoysa, by 3,195 (polling 44% of the total vote). The election results however left neither of Ceylon's two major parties with a majority, with the result being the calling of another election. Perera was subsequently re-elected at the 5th parliamentary election held on 20 July 1960. This time receiving 13,622 votes (50% of the total vote), 2,724 votes ahead of the SLFP candidate, D. Oliver Jayasuriya, and 11,314 votes ahead of de Zoysa.

Perera was also re-elected at the 6th parliamentary election, held on 22 March 1965, receiving 21,867 votes (61% of the total vote), and at the 1970 general election, polling 21,657 votes (50% of the total vote). He served as the Deputy Chairman of Committees from 9 March 1968 to 25 March 1970.

In 1976 Perera died whilst still in office. A by-election for Ja-Ela electorate was held on 23 April that year, and the seat was filled by Joseph Michael Perera from the UNP.

References

1922 births
1976 deaths
Deputy chairmen of committees of the Parliament of Sri Lanka
Members of the 4th Parliament of Ceylon
Members of the 5th Parliament of Ceylon
Members of the 6th Parliament of Ceylon
Members of the 7th Parliament of Ceylon
Sinhalese politicians
United National Party politicians